Through The Darkness is the third album by New York City glam punk band D Generation. It was their second released via Columbia Records, and their last release until 2016. It is the only D Generation album without founding member and guitarist Richard Bacchus, who was replaced by Todd Youth. The album was produced by T. Rex and David Bowie producer Tony Visconti.  Drummer Michael Wildwood's writing credits on "Lonely" and "Cornered" are listed under his actual name of "Michael Reich."

D Generation broke up a month after its release; the band eventually regrouped to record a new album, Nothing Is Anywhere, which was released 17 years later, in 2016. "Helpless" was taken from the record as a single; the single appeared in the movie The Faculty.

Critical reception
CMJ New Music Report wrote that the album's "relentless power chords could light up all of Times Square."

Track listing
"Helpless" (Jesse Malin) - 3:33
"Every Mother's Son" (Malin) - 2:46
"Hatred" (Malin, Danny Sage) - 3:19
"Rise & Fall" (Malin) - 2:53
"Only a Ghost" (Malin) - 4:04
"Lonely" (Malin, Sage, Howie Pyro, Michael Reich) - 4:09
"Good Ship Down" (Malin, Sage) - 3:23
"Sick on the Radio" (Malin, Sage) - 3:30
"Chinatown" (Malin, Pyro) - 2:09
"So Messed Up" (Malin) - 3:31
"Sunday Secret Saints" (Malin, Todd Youth) - 3:03
"Cornered" (Reich) - 3:25
"Don't Be Denied (Neil Young) -16:27
 "Violent Love" (Malin; an unlisted track which begins at the 10:00 mark of Track 13)

Personnel
D Generation 
 Jesse Malin - vocals
 Todd Youth - guitar
 Howie Pyro - bass
 Danny Sage - guitar
 Michael Wildwood - drums

References

D Generation albums
1999 albums
Albums produced by Tony Visconti
Columbia Records albums